The 1939 Mississippi State Maroons football team represented Mississippi State College during the 1939 college football season. The Maroons finished 8–2 in head coach Allyn McKeen's first season.

Schedule

References

Mississippi State
Mississippi State Bulldogs football seasons
Mississippi State Maroons football